Yuen Leng Yip Uk is a village in Tai Po District, Hong Kong.

Administration
Yuen Leng Yip Uk is a recognized village under the New Territories Small House Policy. It is one of the villages represented within the Tai Po Rural Committee. For electoral purposes, Yuen Leng Yip Uk is part of the Hong Lok Yuen constituency, which was formerly represented by Zero Yiu Yeuk-sang until May 2021.

See also
 Yuen Leng Lei Uk, an adjacent village

References

External links
 Delineation of area of existing village Yuen Leng Yip Uk (Tai Po) for election of resident representative (2019 to 2022)

Villages in Tai Po District, Hong Kong